Yap Soo Huey is a Malaysian politician. She was a member of the Penang State Legislative Assembly representing the constituency of Pulau Tikus for one term from 2013 to 2018. She is a member of the Democratic Action Party (DAP), a component party of Pakatan Harapan (PH) coalition.

Yap graduated from Monash University, Australia, in 2005 with a bachelor's degree in Science, and was awarded Honours. She then commenced a doctoral candidature, studying the HIV virus, before returning to Penang to work for the Chief Minister, Lim Guan Eng, on his science council. She was appointed as Lim's Science, Technology and
Innovation Officer.

In the 2013 election, Yap contested the seat of Pulau Tikus for Lim's DAP. She polled 11,256 votes, defeating her Barisan Nasional opponent with a  majority of 8220 votes, as the DAP retained power in Penang.

In the State Assembly, Yap has promoted bicycling as an alternative to automobiles. She has also promoted the one-way traffic system in Pulau Tikus. In 2014, she said that Pulau Tikus needs better public transport.

Yap did not contest to seek a second term for her Pulau Tikus state seat in the 2018 election as to pursue her Master's in Urban and Transport Planning studies in US.

Election results

See also 

Pulau Tikus (state constituency)

References 

Year of birth missing (living people)
Living people
Malaysian people of Chinese descent
Democratic Action Party (Malaysia) politicians
Women MLAs in Penang
Members of the Penang State Legislative Assembly
Monash University alumni
21st-century Malaysian politicians
21st-century Malaysian women politicians